Vincent Pedone is a former American state legislator who served in the Massachusetts House of Representatives from 1993 to 2012. He served in the United States Army, 1/327 Infantry, from 1985 to 1987. He is Executive Officer of the Massachusetts State University Council of Presidents. He is a Worcester resident and a member of the Democratic Party. He also serves as Chairman of the Worcester Redevelopemt Authority.

External links
 "State Rep. Pedone leaving office." Worcester Telegram & Gazette. January 6, 2012.

Living people
Year of birth missing (living people)
Democratic Party members of the Massachusetts House of Representatives